The Peninsula is a 23-floor tower in the Business Bay in Dubai, United Arab Emirates. Construction of the Peninsula was initially expected to be completed in 2008, but has yet to commence as of 2022.

See also 
 List of buildings in Dubai

External links
Emporis

Proposed skyscrapers in Dubai
Buildings and structures under construction in Dubai